Steeplejack Brewing Company is a brewery with three locations in the U.S. state of Oregon. The business operates in Portland and Hillsboro, and has announced plans to expand to Manzanita.

Description and history 

Business partners Brody Day and Dustin Harder opened the original restaurant in 2021. Housed in the former Metropolitan Community Church in northeast Portland's Sullivan's Gulch neighborhood, the restaurant serves burgers and craft beer.

In 2022, a second location opened on Southwest Beaverton-Hillsdale Highway. The restaurant has a seating capacity of approximately 200 people, and serves pizza and salads, as well as arancini and polenta as sides.

A third location in Hillsboro was announced in 2021, and began operating in 2022. In 2022, owners announced plans to open a fourth location in Manzanita.

Anna Buxton was Steepejack's brewmaster, as of 2022. Steeplejack was named Best New Brewery at the 2022 Oregon Beer Awards.

See also
 Brewing in Oregon

References

External links 

 

Beer in Oregon
Restaurants in Hillsboro, Oregon
Restaurants in Portland, Oregon
Sullivan's Gulch, Portland, Oregon